Olympiada is a village and a community of the Elassona municipality. Before the 2011 local government reform it was a part of the municipality of Olympos. The 2011 census recorded 465 inhabitants in the village and 591 inhabitants in the community. The community of Olympiada covers an area of 12.904 km2.

Administrative division
The community of Olympiada consists of two settlements:
Olympiada
 Sparmos

Population
According to the 2011 census, the population of the settlement of Olympiada was 465 people, an increase of almost 18% compared with the population of the previous census of 2001.

History 
Olympiada was founded by Pontic refugees, who came from the former Russian province  Kars Oblast in Eastern Anatolia during the 1923 population exchange. Christoforos Tsertikidis is said to be the leading founder of Olympiada, and is honored with a statue in the village square.

See also
 List of settlements in the Larissa regional unit

References

Populated places in Larissa (regional unit)